Ángel Malvicino (20 May 1921 – 2 June 2008) was an Argentine rower. He competed in the men's double sculls event at the 1948 Summer Olympics.

References

External links
 

1921 births
2008 deaths
Argentine male rowers
Olympic rowers of Argentina
Rowers at the 1948 Summer Olympics
Sportspeople from Entre Ríos Province